List of venerable people may refer to:

 List of venerated Catholics
 List of venerable people (Eastern Orthodox)
 List of archdeacons in the Church of England
 List of archdeacons in the Church in Wales

See also
 List of people known as the Venerable